Chameleon is the sixth album by the American singing trio Labelle. Though Patti LaBelle's autobiography Don't Block The Blessings revealed that LaBelle planned a follow-up to Chameleon entitled Shaman, the album never materialized. The trio would not release another new recording until 2008's Back to Now. The final album was moderately successful peaking at #94 at the Pop charts and #21 on the R&B charts. Only two singles made the charts which were "Get You Somebody New" which peaked at #50 on the Pop charts and their memorable song "Isn't It A Shame" which peaked at #18 on the R&B charts. "Isn't It A Shame" was later sampled by Nelly on his 2004 hit, "My Place", which featured Jaheim.

Track listing 
All tracks composed by Nona Hendryx; except where indicated
 "Get You Somebody New" (Joe Crane) (6:10)
 "Come into My Life" (6:44)
 "Isn't It a Shame" (Randy Edelman) (7:58)
 "Who's Watching the Watcher?" (4:15)
 "Chameleon" (5:15)
 "Gypsy Moths" (5:00)
 "A Man in a Trenchcoat (Voodoo)" (7:49)
 "Going Down Makes Me Shiver" (7:07)

Personnel 
Patti LaBelle, Nona Hendryx, Sarah Dash - vocals
James Ellison - piano, keyboards, synthesizer 
David Rubinson, Tom Coster - synthesizer
Eddie Martinez, Ray Parker Jr., Wah Wah Watson - guitar
Carmine Rojas - bass guitar
James Gadson - drums, percussion 
Scott Mathews - drums 
José Chepitó Áreas, Leon Chancler - percussion
Emilio Castillo, Lenny Pickett - tenor saxophone
Stephen Kupka - baritone saxophone
Kurt McGettrick - bass saxophone
Fred Catero, David Rubinson - engineers
Basic song arrangements for Nona Hendryx material were: LaBelle, James "Budd" Ellison, Eddie Martinez and Rev. Batts

References 

1976 albums
Labelle albums
Albums produced by Dave Rubinson
Albums produced by Vicki Wickham
Epic Records albums
Albums recorded at Wally Heider Studios